Zafreh (also Romanized as Zefreh) is a village in Oshtorjan Rural District, in the Central District of Falavarjan County, Isfahan Province, Iran. In the 2006 census, its population was 3,891, in 991 families. It is said that its population has grown to about 4000, in approximately 1300 families. Heidari, Sadeghi, Ghasemi, Moayed, and Hosseini are the top five populated families in the village.

References 

2. "Census of the Islamic Republic of Iran, 1385 (2006)" (Excel). statistical Center of Iran. Archived from the original on 2011-11-11.

Populated places in Falavarjan County